The CSA 4-Day Domestic Series is the domestic first class cricket competition of South Africa. The tournament is contested by teams from all nine provinces of South Africa. 

First contested as the Currie Cup from 1889–90, the tournament has undergone many changes and modifications in its history. In 2004, the traditional province based format was replaced, with many teams amalgamating. In its place six entirely professional franchises were created that represented much larger population areas.

The competition underwent significant restructuring once again before the start of the 2021–22 season. The six team franchise system was disbanded and the tournament returned to its more traditional format. Fifteen province based teams now compete across two divisions, determined by promotion and relegation.

History

Early Years

Like many other Commonwealth nations, cricket was first introduced by the British in the early 19th Century, with the sport becoming firmly established in South Africa by the 1880s. In March 1889, a touring English side played a South African XI in two matches, in what would retrospectively be designated as the first Test played in South Africa.

First-class domestic cricket had slowly been developing since 1876, when local settlements and towns played each other in the Cape as part of the Champion Bat Tournament. It was played on five occasions, with its final edition in 1890–91.

Sir Donald Currie, the founder of the Castle Shipping Line and the sponsor of the 1889 English tour, donated a trophy for the champions of the promising domestic competition. The 'Currie Cup' was first awarded to Kimberley, who had beaten Transvaal in the single match competition of 1889–90. From 1892 to 1893, the competition began to take the familiar form of province-based competition in a champion format, inspired by the English County Cricket structure. Kimberley (who became known as Griqualand West for the 1892–93 season) and Transvaal were joined by Western Province (1892–93), Natal, Eastern Province (both 1893–94), Border (1897–98) and Orange Free State (1903–04) — although not all of these teams competed in every season after they were established. Rhodesia and South Western Districts also competed on a once-off basis in the 1904–05 season.

The Currie Cup was not contested every year, and a total of fourteen seasons were contested between its inception and the First World War. Aside from an interruption during the Boer War, typically seasons were not held when the English team were touring. The competition took on several different formats, including a knock-out structure, and a round-robin followed by a challenge final against the previous year's winner; but in 1906–07, a round-robin league format was established, which would be unchanged until 1982–83.

Interwar Years

First class cricket recommenced after the First World War in the 1920–21 season. The series continued to be held roughly two out of every three years, being cancelled during seasons which coincided with Test tours. After the 1925–26, all seven provincial teams featured in every season. They were joined temporarily by Rhodesia (who contested the consecutive 1929–30 and 1931–32 season), and permanently by North Eastern Transvaal in 1937–38, which was the final season before World War II. In all, eleven seasons were played between the wars. During this time, cricket in South Africa began to spread outside the British settler diaspora, particularly in the Afrikaner and Indian community. However, cricket remained strictly, although not yet legally, segregated with various national bodies governing cricket for the different racial groups. First-class domestic continued to be white-only.

Second World War and the beginning of Isolation

After an eight-year hiatus, the Currie Cup restarted in 1946–47 with all eight provincial teams and Rhodesia (who would now feature permanently)

In 1951–52, the competition adopted a two-tiered structure, which was retained in some format until 1999–2000 (except for a one-off recombination into a single division in 1960–61). From its inception, until South Africa's international isolation in 1971, a promotion/relegation structure linked the two tiers, with the winner of the lower division generally replacing the last placed team from the top division — although this was not adhered to every season. The top division generally consisted of four or five teams.

During this time, the stronger provinces began to field a 'B' team in the lower division. Transvaal B was the first to appear (1959–60), followed by Natal B (1965–66). These B-teams were not promoted to the top division when they won the lower competition.

Since the 1965–66 season, the Currie Cup has been contested every year, and was no longer suspended during international tours.

The introduction of apartheid (separation of racial groups by strict legal enforcement) following the 1948 General Election did not have a great impact on the domestic competition. Although previously not bound legally, first-class cricket had long been de facto white-only and international opinion had little practical effect on the domestic game.

Apartheid Isolation: the 1970s and 1980s

Domestic cricket in South Africa reached its peak during the years of isolation in the 1970s and 1980s. With standards exceptionally high, spectators came in their thousands to watch Currie Cup cricket due to the inability to support the national team following South Africa's expulsion in 1970 by the ICC.

The two-division format was retained, but promotion/relegation was abandoned, and from 1971 to 1972, the top division remained constant with five teams: Transvaal, Natal, Eastern Province, Western Province and Rhodesia. The second division expanded with more B-teams: Western Province B joining in 1975–76, and Eastern Province B and Rhodesia B joining in 1977–78.

During the 1970s, the second division became a separate competition from the Currie Cup, known initially as the Castle Bowl (and later under different commercial names, such as UCB Bowl). In 1971–72, North Eastern Transvaal became known as Northern Transvaal.

Political Change and International Restoration: the 1990s

Through the 1980s and 1990s, the weaker provincial teams began to gradually migrate back from the Bowl competition to the Currie Cup. At the same time, those provinces' B-teams began to contest the Bowl, which gradually turned the Bowl entirely into a Currie Cup second XI competition. 

By 1996–97, the Bowl had split into a two-tier competition (with only the top division given first-class status), and by 1999–2000, all stand-alone provincial teams had returned to the Currie Cup, with the Bowl being shut down as a first-class competition.

Northern Transvaal was the first team to return to the Currie Cup, in 1979–80; that same year was the final year for Rhodesia, which did not participate following the end of white-minority rule and independence. Orange Free State returned to the Currie Cup in 1985–86. Border returned permanently in 1991–92 (following an unsuccessful two-season return in 1985–86 and 1986–87). Griqualand West returned in 1996–97. In addition, three new provincial teams entered during this time: Boland, who entered the Bowl in 1980–81, and entered the Cup in 1993–94; and Eastern Transvaal and Western Transvaal, who entered the Bowl in 1991–92, and were the last two teams promoted to the top level in 1999–2000.

During the same time, the Bowl competition was joined by Northern Transvaal B (1982–83), Orange Free State B (1989–90), Border B and Boland B (1993–94) and Griqualand West B (1997–98), as well as a Zimbabwean Board XI (1993–94) and Namibia cricket team (1996–97).

During the 1990s, as South Africa underwent political changes, several teams changed their names to adapt: Orange Free State became Free State (1995–96); Eastern Transvaal became Easterns (1995–96); Western Transvaal became North West (1996–97); Transvaal became Gauteng (1997–98); Northern Transvaal became Northerns (1997–98); and Natal became KwaZulu-Natal (1998–99). The competition itself also changed its name for commercial reasons, becoming the Castle Cup in 1990–91, and then the SuperSport Series in 1996–97.

During this era, the format of the competition changed several times. In 1982–83, a final was played between the top two teams; this was expanded to a four-team knock-out in 1983–84 and contracted to a three-team knock-out in 1985–86. In 1987–88, the league was split into two pools with a single final between the pool winners. In 1990–91, the league returned to a single pool with no final. The final returned in 1998–99. Then, with eleven teams from 1999 to 2000, the league adopted a format similar to the 1999 Cricket World Cup, with a super eight or super six round before a single final.

The most notable feature of this era was the end of the dominance of Transvaal, Natal and Western Province. Prior to the 1988–89 season, the three teams had amongst them won 59 of the 60 Currie Cups contested — the only exception being Kimberley's win in the second tournament in 1890–91, won based on the result of a single game against Transvaal. In 1988–89, Eastern Province finally broke that dominance when it beat Transvaal in the final. Orange Free State would win its first championship in the 1990s, and Easterns would also win a championship in the 2000s.

In first-class domestic cricket, Transvaal/Gauteng were the most successful team to have played, winning the competition 25 times between 1889–90 and 2004–05, as well as four shared titles.

Franchise Era: 2004/05 – 2020/21

In 2004–05, the format of South African domestic cricket was changed entirely. The eleven provincial teams were rationalised into six new teams: Western Province and Boland merged to form the Cape Cobras; Griqualand West and Free State formed the Eagles (who later became the Knights in 2010–11); Eastern Province and Border became the Warriors; North West and Gauteng became the Lions; Northerns and Easterns became the Titans; and KwaZulu-Natal became the Dolphins. These changes occurred across limited overs cricket as well as first class cricket, although the round-robin format was kept.

In the franchise era, the Titans (formerly North Eastern Transvaal/Northern Transvaal) were the most successful, winning six titles.

The eleven provincial Currie Cup teams, as well as South Western Districts and KwaZulu-Natal Inland, continued to compete separately in the Provincial Three-Day Challenge, which remained a first-class competition, although on a semi-professional level and no longer the top level of red-ball cricket in South Africa.

Return to Provincial Cricket: 2021– 
In March 2021, Cricket South Africa announced that South African domestic cricket would undergo a major restructuring, with the six-team franchise system, as well as the semi-professional Provincial Competition, being dissolved. A new format of 15 first-class teams playing in two separate divisions, determined by promotion and relegation (after 2023/24), has been created in its place. 

From 2019, provinces and cricket unions submitted bids to CSA to make a case to be considered for the top division for the initial two seasons. The bidding process was overseen by the Independent Evaluation Committee (IEE) who took into account a range of criteria, such as cricketing and financial operations, women's and age-group development, transformation policies and stadium infrastructure.

Eight teams make up the first division, with 16 contracted players each, and seven teams the second division, with 11 contracted players each, taking the total to 205. 

CSA believes that the new format will provide more opportunities for players to compete at a high standard just below international cricket, in turn providing a wider talent pool for the national selectors. It is hoped that wider selection of teams at the highest domestic level will help increase playing opportunities of all races, particularly those currently underrepresented.

Although the new format being seen as a return to the more traditional structure, some of South Africa's nine provinces  have more than one team. Only Free State, Limpopo, Mpumalanga, Northern Cape and North West – the least populated provinces – will have one team. Some new sides have opted to keep the name of their previous franchises to which they belonged, whilst others have decided on new branding.

Teams 
2022/23 Season

Competition format 

Points System

Teams are awarded points based on the result of the match as follows:
 Outright victory: 16 points
 Tie: 8 points
 Draw: 6 points
 Any other result: 0 points

In addition, teams earn bonus points based on their performance in the first 100 overs of each team's first innings:
 Batting bonus points: 1 point for reaching 150 runs, then 0.02 points for each run thereafter
 Bowling bonus points: 1 point for taking three wickets, then 1 point for each two wickets thereafter

A points system of this basic structure was first introduced in 1971–72, and has been used in almost all seasons since; the current points system was introduced in the 2017–18 season.

Former Teams

Franchise Era: 2004/05 – 2020/21 

 The Knights were known as the Eagles prior to the 2010–11 season.

Provincial Era: 1889/90 – 2004/05

Seasons

*Numbers in parentheses count outright championships only.

Championships

Combined Team Era

Currie Cup – Provincial Era

Note: Transvaal B and South West Districts are not shown in the table. Each contested only one season in the top division, and neither finished in the top two.

Currie Cup Second Division and Bowl Competition

Note: Includes only Currie Cup lower division and Bowl seasons with full first-class status.

Note: To minimise the size of the table, teams which contested five or fewer seasons without winning or placing second are not shown. These teams were: Orange Free State B/Free State B, Rhodesia B/Zimbabwe-Rhodesia B, Griqualand West B, Zimbabwe Board XI, Border B and Boland B.

Notable performances 

Two double centuries in a season
 Dudley Nourse 1936–37
Five centuries in successive innings
 Mike Procter 1970–71
Five centuries in six innings
 Peter Kirsten 1976–77
Five wickets in six balls
 William Henderson 1937–38
Four wickets with consecutive balls
 Albert Borland 1926–27
 Bob Crisp 1931–32
 Bob Crisp 1933–34
 William Henderson 1937–38
Ten wickets in an innings
 Bert Vogler 10/26 1906–07
 Stephen Jefferies 10/59 1987–88
 Mario Olivier 10/65 2007–08
 Sean Whitehead 10/36 2021–22
Fifteen wickets in a match
 George Glover 15/68 1893–94
 Bert Vogler 16/38 1906–07
 Buster Nupen 16/136 1931–32
 Jackie Botten 15/49 1958–59
 Sean Whitehead 15/100 2021–22
A 100 runs and 10 wickets in a match
 Aubrey Faulkner 1908–09
 Xenophon Balaskas, twice 1929–30
 Lennox Brown 1937–38
 James Liddle 1951–52
 Percy Mansell 1951–52
 Clive Rice 1975–76
Ten wicketkeeping dismissals in a match
 Ray Jennings 1982–83
 Richie Ryall 1984–85
 Ray Jennings 1986–87
 Ray Jennings 1986–87
 Dave Richardson 1988–89
 Dave Richardson 1989–90
 Dane Vilas 2008–09
 Morne van Wyk 2008–09

Individual records 

 7000 runs in a career  

 800 runs in a season 

 Highest individual scores

 300 wickets in a career

 50 wickets in a season

 All-round play 3000 runs and 300 wickets

 All-round double, 400 runs and 40 wickets in a season

Wicketkeeping

Sponsorship 
Between 1889–90 and 1990–91, the tournament was named the "Currie Cup" after Sir Donald Currie, the founder of the Castle Shipping Line, who had sponsored the first English tour to South Africa and donated a trophy for the domestic champions. 

The competition took its first title sponsor for the 1990–91 season, becoming the "Castle Cup", and from 1996–97 the broadcaster SuperSport assumed naming rights as the "SuperSport Series". 

For the 2012–13 season, the competition was renamed once again, becoming the "Sunfoil Series" after the Willowton Group formed a partnership with Cricket South Africa. This agreement lasted until 2018–19 after Willowton Group withdrew sponsorship.

The competition has been rebranded as the CSA 4-Day Domestic Series due to the lack of a title sponsor.

References

External links
 CricketArchive

 
First-class cricket competitions
Recurring sporting events established in 1889
Professional sports leagues in South Africa